Johnson Cove is a cove entered between Pio Point and Pearson Point on the west side of Bird Island, off the west end of South Georgia. The name appears to be first used in a 1948 British Admiralty pilot (navigation guide).

References

Coves of South Georgia and the South Sandwich Islands